Pająk is a Polish surname, meaning "spider". Pajonk is a phonetic respelling. Notable people with the surname include:
 Antoni Pająk (1893–1965), Polish politician
 Daria Pająk (born 1993), Polish bowler
 Grzegorz Pająk (born 1987), Polish volleyball player
 Henryk Pająk (born 1937), Polish writer, journalist and publisher
 Janusz Pająk (born 1944), Polish wrestler
 John Pajak (1932–2009), American judge
 Leon Pająk (1909–1990), Polish army officer
 Marek Pająk (born 1977), Polish musician and singer
 Dirk-Achim Pajonk (born 1969), German athlete
 Tomáš Pajonk (born 1981), Czech politician

See also
 
 

Polish-language surnames